The 2013–14 All-Ireland Intermediate Club Hurling Championship was the tenth staging of the All-Ireland Intermediate Club Hurling Championship since its establishment by the Gaelic Athletic Association in 2004.

The All-Ireland final was played on 8 February 2014 at Croke Park in Dublin, between Rower-Inistioge from Kilkenny and Kilnadeema-Leitrim from Galway. Clara won the match by 1-16 to 1-09 to claim their first All-Ireland title.

Connacht Intermediate Club Hurling Championship

Connacht semi-final

Connacht final

Leinster Intermediate Club Hurling Championship

Leinster quarter-finals

Leinster semi-finals

Leinster final

Munster Intermediate Club Hurling Championship

Munster quarter-finals

Munster semi-finals

Munster final

Ulster Intermediate Club Hurling Championship

Ulster quarter-finals

Ulster semi-finals

Ulster final

All-Ireland Intermediate Club Hurling Championship

All-Ireland quarter-final

All-Ireland semi-finals

All-Ireland final

Championship statistics

Miscellaneous

 The All-Ireland semi-final between Kilnadeema-Leitrim and Youghal was originally scheduled for 26 January 2014, however, the match was postponed due to an unplayable pitch at the Gaelic Grounds in Limerick.

References

All-Ireland Intermediate Club Hurling Championship
All-Ireland Intermediate Club Hurling Championship
All-Ireland Intermediate Club Hurling Championship